Lucaya is a suburb of Freeport, Bahamas, a city on the island of Grand Bahama, approximately 105 mi (160 km) east-northeast of Fort Lauderdale, Florida. Lucaya's primary industry is tourism.

Major hotels and attractions in the resort are the Our Lucaya resort, which includes both The Radisson and Reef Village properties, Pelican Bay Hotel and the UNEXSO (UNderwater EXplorers SOciety) dive charter operation.

UNEXSO was the first destination dive charter business in the world and now features a dolphinarium as well as a variety of SCUBA diving charters including shark feeding dives.

Port Lucaya is a popular spring break destination with the socializing centering on Count Basie Square.

See also
Lucaya International School
Albert Tillman

Gallery

Populated places in the Bahamas
Grand Bahama